From Copenhagen Stock Exchange (Danish: Fra Kjøbenhavns Børs) is a monumental 1895 oil on canvas group portrait painting by Peder Severin Krøyer, featuring 50 representatives of the Danish commercial and financial industries gathered in the Great Hall of the Exchange Building in Copenhagen, Denmark.

History
The idea for the painting was conceived by Gustav Adolph Hagemann in 1881 while he was entertaining C. F. Tietgen who was posing for Peder Severin Krøyer's portrait of him. Hagemann presented the idea of four monumental group portrait paintings for the newly refurbished Great Hall in Børsen featuring leading representatives of the trade, industry agriculture and shipping sectors in Denmark.

The Exchange Building was selected as the scene for the first of the paintings. The building had been purchased by Grosserer-Societetet in 1857. Krøyer's price for painting it was DKK 20,000 and the plan was to raise the money through contributions from the people seen in it. The price for one of the more prominent locations in the foreground was initially DKK 800 while the price for a location in the middle was DKK 500 and one in the background was DKK 300. It turned out to be more difficult than expected to raise the money and things did not start to move until S. V. Isberg from J. B. Suhr & Søn offered to pay DKK 5,000. This lowered the prices to DKK 500, DKK 300 and DKK 100.
  
The painting was completed in 1895. The original plan of commissioning three more paintings was abandoned. Hagemann did, however, in 1901, commission Men of Industry (Danish: Industriens Mænd), as a private commission for his home in Bredgade.

List of people portrayed in the painting
The people portrayed in the painting are:

 Johan Hansen (1838-1913)
 H. P. J. Lyngbye (1834-1920)
 Jacob Holmblad (1839-1904)
 Jacob B. A. Salomon
 Carl Wall
 Georg Petersen (1820-1900)
 Sabinus Seidelin (1819-1904)
 Jacob Heinrich Moresco (1828-1906)
  Sophus Munk Plum (1847-1904)
 Carl Albert Næser (1841-1913) 
 Emil Vett (1843–1911)
 Theodor Wessel (1842-1905)
 Bernhard Ruben
 Johan Frederik Carøe (1817-1893)
 Harald Hansen (1835-1902)
 Alfred P. Hansen (-1893)
 Vilhelm Petersen (1817-1895?)
 Ferdinand Ekman (1849-1901)
 Benny Levin Fræckel (1825-1893)
 Frants Andreas Lorck (1841-1914)
 Harry Hertz (1828-1895)
 Franz Christopher Smidt (1732-1896)
 Moritz Levy (1824-1892)
 Ludvig Bramsen (1847-1904)
 Claus L. Smidt (1841-1918)
 Peter Nicolai Damm (1839-1918)
 Martin R. Henriques (1825-1912)
 Isak Salomon Salomonsen (1830-1916)
 Isak Glückstadt (1839-1910)
 Axel Prior (1843-1898)
 Christian Holm (1835-1920)
 Carl Frederik Tietgen (1728-1901)
 Toxen Worm (1837-1902)
 Gotfred Halkier (1837-1917)
 Adolf Carl (1848-1908)
 Andreas Collstrop (1847-1933)
 Albert Berendsen (1860-1897)
 Victor Høffding (1836-1910)
 Johannes M. Holm (1835-1912)
 F. Fischer
 F. Schiødte
 Marcus Meyer
 Christoph Cloëtta (1835-1897)
 S. V. Isberg (1820-1895)
 Sigfred Goldschmidt (1831-1906)
 Philip W. Heyman (1837-1893)
 Selgen Sthyr (1837-1922)
 Carl Gammeltoft (1856-1934)
 Valdemar Holm (1835-1908
 Louis Meyer (1843-1929)

Related works

Krøyer completed a  49cm x 79 cm oil-on-canvas study for the Stock Exchange painting in 1894. It has previously been owned by G. A. Hagemann (1929), Paul Hagemann and the Codan insurance company but has later been sold on a Bruun Rasmussen auction to an anonymous buyer. It has been on display at the following exhibitions:
 
  Venice, "Esposizione Internationale d'Arte Della Citta di Venezia", 1909 no. 634.
 Kunstforeningen, "P. S. Krøyer 1851-1909", 1910 no. 239. 
 Forum Copenhagen, "Det danske Kunststævne", 1929.
 Charlottenborg, "Mindeudstilling for P. S. Krøyer 1851-1951", 1951 

Krøyer has also painted a number of individual studies for some of the portraits. These include a study for the portrait of S. V. Isberg (The David Collection, 1894) and Peter Nicolaj Damm (Museum of Fine Arts, Ghent, 1894).

Thomas Klugge was in connection with the 100 years anniversary of the painting commissioned to paint a group portrait painting of the CEO and 13 committee members of the Danish Chamber of Commerce. Klugge and Krøyer are seen on the cover of two books held by two of the people seen in the painting. The painting is located in the Exchange Building's library.

See also
 A Meeting in the Royal Danish Academy of Sciences and Letters

References

External links

 Source
 Source
 Videnskabernes Selskab

Paintings by Peder Severin Krøyer
Group portraits by Danish artists
Cultural depictions of Danish men
Paintings in Copenhagen
1895 paintings